1701 may refer to:

1701 (number)
1701, the year
1701 Naval Air Squadron of the Fleet Air Arm
Anno 1701, alternatively titled 1701 A.D., a real-time strategy computer game.
Commodore 1701, a Commodore 64 peripheral
Starship Enterprise, a ship in the fictional Star Trek universe which has the registry number of NCC-1701. Each successive Enterprise has an alphanumeric suffix running from A to at least J.
United Nations Security Council Resolution 1701